IEEE Photonics Technology Letters is a semi-monthly peer-reviewed scientific journal which focuses on the theory, design, fabrication, and performance of lasers and optical devices as well as optical fibre technologies. It is published by the IEEE Photonics Society and was established in 1989. The editor-in-chief is Boon S. Ooi (King Abdullah University of Science and Technology).

Abstracting and indexing
The journal is abstracted and indexed in:

According to the Journal Citation Reports, the journal has a 2020 impact factor of 2.486.

References

External links

Semi-monthly journals
Publications established in 1989
Engineering journals
Optics journals
English-language journals
IEEE academic journals